Richard Ng Man-tat (2 January 1952 – 27 February 2021), commonly called Uncle Tat, was a Hong Kong actor originally from Fujian. He was a veteran in the Hong Kong film industry, with dozens of awards, including Best Supporting Actor at the 10th Hong Kong Film Awards for his role in A Moment of Romance. Ng was best known for his comedic roles alongside Stephen Chow and was a versatile actor with many memorable performances throughout his career.

Early life
Richard Ng Man-tat was born on Gulangyu island in Xiamen, Fujian, on 2 January 1952. He had an older sister and two younger brothers. Ng's family migrated to Hong Kong when he was five. Ng studied at Aberdeen Technical School, where he took a mechanical course to help provide for the family.

Career

Early acting career and bankruptcy 
Ng noticed TVB's Chinese Folklore, which had an actor, Lin Wei Tu, who was Ng's coworker at the factory where he was working. Ng thought he met the requirements of being an actor and signed up for TVB's acting classes in 1973. In 1974, he graduated fifth in his batch of trainees, alongside veteran actor Chow Yun-fat, and debuted when he was 22. He was one of the seven from his batch to sign an acting contract with TVB. 

Ng's breakout film was the 1979 edition of the television series Chor Lau-heung in which he played Wu Tit-fa. This role allowed him to become one of the more sought-after actors of that time. However, he became caught up in the fame and fortune that he gained, and starting gambling. By 1980, he owed  to loan sharks and was declared bankrupt. TVB then minimised his appearances. Ng wanted to borrow money from his friends, including Chow, but he was turned away by them, and then considered suicide as a possible recourse. After some consideration, Ng decided to restudy and improve his acting skills, reading up on Konstantin Stanislavski's An Actor Prepares and Zheng Junli's The Birth of a Role (角色的誕生). To pay off his debts, two-thirds of Ng's salary was used for repayments. While repaying his debts, Ng was cast in 1981's , in which his efforts were recognised, thus enabling him to continue acting in films and television series. The debts were paid off by 1984.

Acting career resurgence 
In 1985, Ng acted in the television series Police Cadet '84 which was well-received by local television audiences, and allowed his peers in the industry to re-evaluate him in a positive manner. He began to receive new work at a more consistent rate. In 1988, Ng began to co-star with Stephen Chow with their first TVB television series together, The Final Combat, and also the popular 1990 film All for the Winner, where he played the role of Chow's uncle. From then on, the two collaborated in numerous "mo lei tau" films in the same style as All for the Winner. He was best known for co-starring with Chow in comedy films that broke Hong Kong box office charts in the 1990s.

Through 1991, Ng carried a grudge against Chow Yun-fat for not lending him money. When Ng won the Best Supporting Actor award at the 10th Hong Kong Film Awards for A Moment of Romance, he openly snubbed Chow. Benny Chan, the director of A Moment of Romance, then revealed to Ng that it was on Chow's recommendation that Ng had gotten the role for the film. Chow also had similarly assisted him to get the role for Heroic Cops. Chow said that he didn't want to lend money to him as he feared that it would turn into a form of reliance, making it harder for Ng to recover from his gambling habit. Both Ng and Chow reconciled thereafter. 

Although Ng owed much of his popularity to co-starring in comedy films, he showed himself to be a versatile actor in successfully portraying various roles. An example of such was in his portrayal of Sister 13's father in Portland Street Blues, where he played a man who could not feel anything but abuse and rejection. It proved to be the perfect complement to his usual "mo lei tau" style with Chow. He also played Andy Lau's sidekick in the Lee Rock series in a more serious role, which won him Best Supporting Actor at the 10th Hong Kong Film Awards. In Hong Kong, Ng was often known as "Uncle Tat", a nickname most likely derived from his role as Stephen Chow's sidekick (often as his uncle) in their films. Ng was sometimes credited as Richard Ng.

In 2001, Ng and Stephen Chow collaborated for the last time in Shaolin Soccer. In 2006 Ng starred in the Taiwanese drama The Hospital as Tang Guotai, a professor and director of surgery. He was subsequently nominated for Best Supporting Actor at the 42nd Golden Bell Awards in 2007.

In 2019, Ng starred in the science fiction film The Wandering Earth, in which he played the grandfather of the male lead. Ng nearly rejected the role as he believed that the Chinese film industry was not fit to make science fiction movies, and he had to undergo heart surgery at the time. During the filming, he had to bear the weight of a  spacesuit while still recovering from his heart failure in 2014.

Personal life 
Ng married Mak Lee Lee, a Hong Kong artist, in 1976. They met during a TVB training class. Mak gave birth to twin daughters. While Ng and Mak were still married, Ng cohabited with Lo Siu Chi (卢少慈), also a Hong Kong artist, and had a daughter together. In 1993, while Ng was filming All's Well, Ends Well Too in Singapore, he met Hou Shanyan (侯珊燕), a Malaysian beauty pageant runner-up and artist. Ng married Hou in 1996, and they had a daughter and son. He lived with his family in Johor Bahru, Malaysia, until shortly before his death, when he asked to spend time in Hong Kong.

Being a native of Xiamen, he was fluent in Hokkien. He sometimes spoke Hokkien with the cast when he was filming in Taiwan.

Illness and death
Ng was admitted to the hospital in 2014 for heart failure due to a viral infection. After this incident, Ng had a will drawn up, and remained in poor health from that point. In February 2021, he confirmed that he suffered from liver cancer and had been undergoing chemotherapy followed by rest and recuperation, but his condition had turned critical.

On 27 February 2021, Ng died in his sleep at Tai Wai's Union Hospital at the age of 69.

Filmography

Film

Television

References

External links
 
 Ng Man Tat at the Hong Kong Movie DataBase

1952 births
2021 deaths
20th-century Hong Kong male actors
20th-century Chinese male actors
21st-century Hong Kong male actors
21st-century Chinese male actors
Chinese male film actors
Chinese male television actors
Hong Kong male film actors
Hong Kong male television actors
Hong Kong expatriates in Malaysia
Hong Kong male comedians
Hong Kong Christians
Converts to Christianity from Buddhism
Male actors from Fujian
People from Xiamen
Deaths from liver cancer
Deaths from cancer in Hong Kong